is an railway station in Asahi-ku, Osaka, Osaka Prefecture, Japan, and operated by West Japan Railway Company (JR West). The station was opened on 16 March 2019.

Lines
Shirokitakōendōri Station is served by the Osaka Higashi Line, and operation commenced on 16 March 2019.

Layout
The station has two side platforms, each capable of accommodating eight-car trains.

See also
 Miyakojima Station on the Osaka Municipal Subway nearby
 List of railway stations in Japan

References

External links
 Osaka Soto-kanjo Railway website 

Railway stations in Osaka Prefecture
Stations of West Japan Railway Company
Railway stations in Japan opened in 2019